The United Kingdom's Strategic Command (StratCom), previously known as Joint Forces Command (JFC), manages allocated joint capabilities from the three armed services.

History

Background 
In August 2010 the then Defence Secretary, Liam Fox, asked Lord Levene, a former Chief of Defence Procurement, to chair the Defence Reform Steering Group. The group's remit was to independently review defence and the structure and management of the Ministry of Defence. The group reported in June 2011, with a key recommendation being that a Joint Forces Command (JFC) should be created to manage and deliver specific joint capabilities and to take the lead on joint warfare development, learning from lessons and experimentation to advise on how the military should conduct joint operations in the future. The Defence Reform report also made the following recommendations:

 Joint Forces Command should be led by a military four-star ranking officer who would have responsibility for commanding and generating the joint capabilities allocated to the command and setting the framework for joint enablers that sit in the single services.
 A number of military organisations currently managed centrally within the MOD should pass to Joint Forces Command, including the Directorate Special Forces, the Defence Academy and the Development Concepts and Doctrine Centre.
 The Permanent Joint Headquarters (PJHQ) should sit within the Joint Forces Command, but report for operational purposes direct to the Chief of the Defence Staff.
 In implementing Joint Forces Command, the MOD should review in detail joint or potentially joint capabilities and functions across the armed services (Royal Navy, Army and Royal Air Force), to determine which could be rationalised, the benefit of further joint organisations, which organisations should transfer to Joint Forces Command and which should transfer to a lead service.

Establishment as Joint Forces Command 
The creation of Joint Forces Command was overseen by the then Vice Chief of the Defence Staff, General Sir Nicholas Houghton, Air Chief Marshal Sir Stuart Peach, and the Defence Reform Unit, alongside the wider implementation of the new defence operating model identified by the report on Defence Reform. ACM Peach was appointed as the first commander of Joint Forces Command on 15 September 2011, taking up the post on 1 December 2011.

Initial Operating Capability was achieved in April 2012 and Full Operating Capability reached in April 2013, giving JFC a total of some 30,000 military and civil personnel.

Change to Strategic Command 

The Secretary of State for Defence, Penny Mordaunt, announced in July 2019 that Joint Forces Command would be renamed as 'Strategic Command', dealing with the Ministry of Defence's transformation programme and taking responsibility for a range of strategic and defence-wide capabilities. Strategic Command will integrate fighting across Air, Land, Sea, Cyber and Space and ensure the armed services operate at the forefront of the information environment.

On 9 December 2019, it was announced that Joint Forces Command was renamed as Strategic Command.

Joint Force Command and Strategic Command handled a number of space functions. Strategic Command had been responsible for satellite communications, intelligence, surveillance and reconnaissance (ISR) and positioning, navigation and timing (PNT), and the RAF for ballistic missile defence, space control and space domain awareness. However, United Kingdom Space Command was established on 1 April 2021 at RAF High Wycombe, and now works with the Space Directorate in London.

Organisations and components
Strategic Command comprises the following organisations and components.

The Commander, Strategic Command, based at Northwood Headquarters, brings coherence to the delivery of joint effect by managing, delivering and championing joint capabilities to support success of military operations. He is supported by a deputy commander. Under Deputy Commander comes Chief of Staff, Director Strategy and Director Capability all who are key members of the Command Group.

Chief of Staff Strategic Command 
Strategic Command Chief of Staff "provides financial authority and supports the command function of Strategic Command headquarters". The Chief of Staff is a member of Strategic Command's Command Group.

Permanent Joint Operating Bases 

The Permanent Joint Operating Bases provide a defensive and security role to British Overseas Territories and allows the UK to project military power overseas. There is a civilian Director Overseas Bases, appointed in 2018. Director Overseas Bases is a member of Strategic Command's Command Group.
 British Forces Cyprus – Sovereign Base Areas of Akrotiri and Dhekelia.
 British Forces South Atlantic Islands – Falkland Islands and South Georgia and the South Sandwich Islands
 British Forces Gibraltar – Gibraltar
 British Indian Ocean Territory – Diego Garcia

Defence Intelligence 

The Chief of Defence Intelligence (DI) is the principal adviser on strategic military intelligence issues. DI primarily provides intelligence and advice to inform policy, deployment and research decisions, working alongside other government departments, agencies, allies, the EU and NATO. CDI is supported by a civilian deputy and a Director Cyber Intelligence and Information Integration. The following groups are the main components of DI.

Joint Forces Cyber Group 
Originally named the Defence Cyber Operations Group, the Joint Forces Cyber Group (JFCyG) was created in May 2013 and plans and co-ordinates UK cyber warfare operations. It commands Joint Cyber Units at GCHQ Cheltenham and MOD Corsham, the Joint Cyber Unit (Reserve) and Information Assurance Units.

The Joint Cyber Unit (Reserve) was established in response to a growing cyber warfare threat and to allow the military to benefit from the expertise of civilian IT specialists. Capabilities include offensive cyber operations. The following units contribute personnel to the cyber reserve.
 Royal Navy Reserve – Reserve Cyber Unit
 British Army Reserve – Land Information Assurance Group
 Specialist Group Information Services, previously 254 (SGIS) Signal Squadron
 Royal Auxiliary Air Force – No. 600 (City of London) Squadron
 Royal Auxiliary Air Force – No. 614 (County of Glamorgan) Squadron

The Joint Forces Intelligence Group 
The Joint Forces Intelligence Group (JFIG) coordinates and analyses intelligence, surveillance and reconnaissance from military and public sources. JFIG is based at RAF Wyton in Cambridgeshire, which is also home to the Defence Intelligence Fusion Centre.

In 2012 the group comprised:
the Defence Geographic Centre (DGC)
the Defence HUMINT Organisation (DHO)
the Joint Aeronautical and Geospatial Organisation (JAGO)
the Defence Geospatial Intelligence Fusion Centre (DGIFC) (formerly the Joint Air Reconnaissance Intelligence Centre)
the Joint Service Signals Organisation (JSSO)

Joint Intelligence Training Group 
The Joint Intelligence Training Group is based at Chicksands in Bedfordshire and provides the British military with intelligence, security, languages and photography training.

Defence Medical Services 

The military and civilian medical and dental personnel from all three British military services, are together known as the Defence Medical Services (DMS). The service is commanded by the Director General DMS (DG DMS), formerly the Surgeon General from headquarters at DMS Whittington in Staffordshire. Under DG DMS, comes Director Defence Healthcare, Director Medical Personnel and Training and Defence Medical Director.

Directorate of Joint Capability 
The Director of Capability is responsible for delivering a joint capability strategy, including in areas such as special forces; military counter-terrorism, explosive ordnance disposal, CBRN and Command, Control, Communications, Computers, Intelligence, Surveillance and Reconnaissance (C4ISR).

Based at RAF Halton in Buckinghamshire, the Joint Information Activities Group (JIAG) is a deployable team of information, media, technical communications and intelligence specialists.

Directorate of Resources and Policy 
The Director of Resources and Policy provides top level budgeting, acts as Senior Finance Officer, Senior Policy Advisor and senior civilian workforce advisor for Joint Forces Command, and is personally responsible for the specific delegations from Director General Finance.  Director of Resources and Policy is a member of Strategic Command's Command Group.

Directorate Defence Logistics and Support 
The Chief of Defence Logistics and Support is a three-star or OF-8 officer.  He or she oversees various appointments such as Director Defence Support Transformation, Assistant Chief of the Defence Staff (Support Operations) and Director Joint Support.

Directorate of Special Forces 
The Director Special Forces (DSF) commands UK Special Forces (UKSF), which are capable of conducting short-notice high-risk operations in challenging environments around the world. The UK's special forces comprise  the Special Boat Service, the Special Air Service, the Special Reconnaissance Regiment, the Special Forces Support Group, 18 (UKSF) Signal Regiment, and the Joint Special Forces Aviation Wing.

Defence Digital 

The MOD's Defence Digital organisation is led by Ministry of Defence chief information officer (CIO) Charles Forte, who is responsible for information strategy and policy across the MOD and also the delivery of information technology systems across the MOD's corporate and military elements. Defence Digital was created in 2019 when Information Systems & Services and a number of organisations were brought together; at that time it had an annual budget of over £2 billion and about 2,400 staff including military, civil servants and contractors. Under CIO comes the following: Director Military Digitalisation, Director Digital Enablement, Director Functional Integration, Chief Data Officer, Director Defensive Cyber and Risk, Executive Director Service Delivery and Operations, Director Operations, Director Delivery Intelligence and Expeditionary Service and Director Core Information Services.

Defence Digital activity is largely at MOD Corsham in Wiltshire, and it has a presence at other sites including:
 Blandford Camp, an Army facility in Dorset, home to the Royal Corps of Signals.
 ISS Boddington, a former non-flying RAF station in Gloucestershire.
 RAF Henlow in Bedfordshire, home to parts of Communication and Information Systems Branch and Operations Support Branch.

Joint Force Development 

Joint Force Development is led by Director General Joint Force Development Air Marshal Ian Gale MBE. It "plans and develops the current and future Joint Force and leads capability for concepts and doctrine, education and training, Defence-wide exercises, experimentation, analysis and lessons". The following groups are the main components of DI.

Defence Academy of the United Kingdom 
Based at MOD Shrivenham in Oxfordshire, the Defence Academy provides higher education for personnel in the British Armed Forces, the Civil Service, other government departments and service personnel from other nations. The Defence Centre of Training Support, originally headquartered at RAF Halton, forms part of the Defence Academy and is responsible for training military instructors and managers, and other aspects of defence training.

Royal College Defence Studies 

The Royal College of Defence Studies The Royal College of Defence Studies (RCDS) instructs the most promising senior officers of the British Armed Forces.

Directorate of Joint Warfare 
The role of the Director of Joint Warfare is to enable joint forces to operate effectively by defining, measuring and validating the joint force capabilities and formations required to meet current, unexpected and emerging threats. The directorate is responsible for the development and maintenance of air–land and air–maritime integration, and support to associated initiatives.

Standing Joint Force Headquarters 
The Standing Joint Force Headquarters (SJFHQ) is a rapidly deployable component. When deployed, SJFHQ is responsible to Chief of Joint Operations through the Chief of Staff (Operations), otherwise the component reports to the Director of Joint Force Development. The Joint Force Headquarters and Joint Force Logistics Component Headquarters come under the command of the SJFHQ Commander and are based at Northwood Headquarters.

Development, Concepts and Doctrine Centre 
The Development, Concepts and Doctrine Centre (DCDC) is the MOD’s think tank and is responsible for research work in support of joint concepts and doctrine, as well as and those relating to the Royal Navy, Royal Air Force and British Army.

Joint Operations 
The Chief of Joint Operations (CJO) provides operational command of UK forces assigned to overseas joint and combined operations and provides politically aware military advice to the MOD in order to achieve UK's strategic objectives on operations. CJO includes the Permanent Joint Headquarters at Northwood Headquarters in Hertfordshire. He is supported by a Chief of Staff (Operations) and a civilian Chief of Staff (Policy and Finance).

Joint Arms Control Implementation Group 
The Joint Arms Control Implementation Group (JACIG) is the UK’s arms control verification agency which is based at RAF Henlow in Bedfordshire. JACIG's work is focussed on implementing three main treaties: the Conventional Armed Forces in Europe (CFE) Treaty, the Vienna Document and the Open Skies Treaty.

Joint Counter-Terrorism Training and Advisory Team 
The Joint Counter-Terrorism Training and Advisory Team (JCTTAT) is based at Risborough Barracks in Kent.

Commanders
A list of those who have served as Commander Joint Forces Command (retitled Commander of Strategic Command on 9 December 2019):

References

External links
 

Joint commands of the United Kingdom
Military units and formations established in 2012
Organisations based in Hertfordshire